Jessica Jones is an American comic book series published by Marvel Comics, featuring Jessica Jones as its protagonist. Initially published as a tie-in to the  2015–2019 Marvel Cinematic Universe (MCU) Netflix television adaptation of the same name, the series was written by Brian Michael Bendis with art from Michael Gaydos. The series ran for 18 issues as part of both Marvel's Marvel NOW! and Marvel Legacy relaunches and lasted from December 2016 until May 2018, when Bendis left Marvel for DC Comics. A digital exclusive relaunch with Kelly Thompson taking over from Bendis and Mattia de Luis taking over from Gaydos occurred in July 2018.  The series is the third to feature Jones as a protagonist following Alias (2001–4) and The Pulse (2004–6), which both featured Bendis and Gaydos on the creative teams (Gaydos drew the last four issues of The Pulse).

Publication history
The relaunched series was announced by Marvel in July 2016 with a release date that fall. The idea to bring back Jones in the comics was brought on through conversations Bendis had with Melissa Rosenberg, the creator of Netflix's Jessica Jones adaptation. Said Bendis, "Any time two writers are sitting there, talking about the character, both writers are formulating a pitch. You can’t help it. It’s the way your brain is trained. After talking about Jessica at WonderCon, I emailed Melissa later in the week and went, “Shit, I think I might have to do this. I’m thinking about doing the comic again, because the last conversation we had made me think of this.” 

In an interview with Comic Book Resources, Bendis discussed how the new portrayal of Jones would be influenced by the changes in the Marvel Universe since 2004: "A lot has happened in the Marvel Universe over the past ten years, cosmic and seismic events. We’re all normal people, too, and that allows for unique mysteries and detective stories, ones that I’m going to lean into. With that came this overwhelming feeling that “something happened, and no one is talking about it.”

After Bendis' departure, many expected the series to be cancelled as part of a wave of Marvel cancellations in late 2017. The final issue, released in March 2018 (cover dated May) noted that the series would continue, "[leaving Jones] to an all new team next issue."  The series has been compiled into three trade paperbacks, released in May and November 2017, as well as in April 2018. 

Two months following the first volume's conclusion, a new serial run of Jessica Jones debuted as a digital exclusive written by Kelly Thompson and illustrated by Mattia de Luis.

Reception
The series holds an average rating of 7.8 out of 10 on comics review aggregation website Comic Book Roundup, indicating generally favorable reviews from 149 critics. The first and last five issues were received well, but issues 6 to 11 had more mixed reviews. Of the first few issues, IGN's Jesse Schedeen said "It's been a long time coming, but Jessica Jones has the solo book she deserves again. And with both Brian Bendis and Michael Gaydos back at the helm, this new series has little trouble recapturing the appeal of its predecessor. The fact that so much about Jessica's life has reverted to the old status quo isn't a drawback, but rather one of the book's main selling points." Issue #7, which had the lowest score of the series at 6.8, was described by Graphic Policy as "...convoluted, unrealistic, and hackneyed. It is the epitome of what men think women want and are like. Bendis portrays Jones as a one-dimensional, agencyless, manic pixie detective for hire in her own story."

Sales
The comic's first issue was the 22nd best-selling comic of October 2016, with 74,291 estimated sales. The series stayed in the Diamond Comic Distributors top 100 list until May 2017, when it dropped to 115th.  After a jump to 46th in October 2017 with 43,392 sales, the series fell to 113th the following month. The comic's final issue was the 112th best-selling comic of March 2018, selling 17,553 issues.

Collected editions

References

American comics titles
Comics by Brian Michael Bendis
Comics about women
Comics set in New York City